The River Wantsum is a tributary of the River Stour, in Kent, England. Formerly, the River Wantsum and the River Stour together formed the Wantsum Channel, which separated the Isle of Thanet from the mainland of Kent. Now the River Wantsum is little more than a drainage ditch starting at Reculver, and ending where it joins the Stour.

Bede, in the 8th century, said that the Wantsum – meaning Wantsum Channel – was "about three furlongs broad [], and is fordable only in two places, for both ends run into the sea". In 1414 there was still a ferry crossing the Wantsum at Sarre, but by 1550 Thanet was no longer an island. It is postulated that the eroded material was carried along the shore and blocked the northern mouth of the Wantsum.

The River Wantsum now joins the Great Stour from the north as a small tributary, just before the Little Stour enters it from the south to form what is thereafter known simply as the River Stour.

References

Wantsum
1Wantsum